Norton Nascimento (4 January 1962 – 21 December 2007) was a Brazilian actor.

Personal life 
Norton Nascimento was born in the city of Belém, capital of the state of Pará. His wife was actress Kelly Candia. He was a member of the Igreja Renascer em Cristo.

Death 
Nascimento had suffered several years of failing health, including a reported heart transplant in December 2003 due to an aortic aneurysm. He died in Beneficência Portuguesa de São Paulo hospital, aged 45, in São Paulo, Brazil, from heart failure due to lung problems.

Filmography

Film credits 
1995: Carlota Joaquina, Princess of Brazil - Fernando Leão
1998: Drama Urbano - Waldo
2000: Até que a Vida nos Separe - Pedro
2004: Araguaia - A Conspiração do Silêncio - Osvaldão

Television credits 
1981: Os Imigrantes
1992: De Corpo e Alma
1992-1999: Você Decide - Dr. Dante / Italo
1993: Fera Ferida - Wotan
1993: Agosto - Chicão
1995: A Próxima Vítima - Sidney Noronha
1996: O Fim do Mundo - Frei Eusébio
1997: Malhação - Fausto
1999-2001: Sai de Baixo - Filipe
1999: Chiquinha Gonzaga - Joaquim Antônio da Silva Calado
2000: Aquarela do Brasil - Bemol
2001: Brava Gente - Marcelo
2001: A Padroeira - Zacarias
2001: As Filhas da Mãe - Investigador Marcelo
2003: Sítio do Picapau Amarelo - Maldoror
2006: Papai Noel Existe (especial de fim de ano)
2007: Maria Esperança - Nocaute (Bento de Jesus) (final appearance)

External links 

Norton Nascimento obituary (Portuguese)

1962 births
2007 deaths
Brazilian male film actors
Brazilian evangelicals
Brazilian male television actors
Deaths from lung disease
People from Belém
Heart transplant recipients